The Marlborough by-election of 1970 was a by-election for the electorate of Marlborough, held on 21 February 1970 during the 30th New Zealand Parliament.

Background
The by-election resulted from the death of Tom Shand on 11 December 1969, only 12 days after he (and the government) had been re-elected on 29 November; and the new National candidate was defeated by the greatest swing against a government since the 1935 general election, in what was a largely rural electorate generally regarded a safe National seat. Tom Shand had held the seat from 1946, when he defeated Labour’s Ted Meachen.

Candidates
Labour
The Labour Party selected Ian Brooks as their candidate. In 1969 he had stood in the electorate.

National
There were five nominees who came forward for the National Party candidacy:

Bruno Dalliessi, the Mayor of Picton
R. J. Doak, a farmer from Amberley who was National's 1969 campaign manager in 
R. W. Palmer, a farmer from Wairau Valley
Anthony "Andy" Shand, a farmer and member of the Kaikoura County Council - son of the previous member

Shand was chosen to contest the seat at the party selection committee meeting.

Social Credit
There were two candidates for the Social Credit Party nomination:

George Kerr, a farmer from Seddon
Jeremy Woodhall, a registered surveyor from Blenheim

Kerr was selected. It was the seventh consecutive time he had contested the seat, having done so at every previous election since .

Campaign
The vote for Tom Shand had been close in 1966. Labour only decided that the seat was winnable in January, and sent in two MPs Arthur Faulkner and Colin Moyle to organise the campaign. Labour's candidate, Brooks, was local; he was a senior clerk in the Picton manual telephone exchange and also had a small farm. The seat was largely rural, but Brooks polled particularly well in Picton, and well in the other two population centres, Blenheim and Kaikoura. At the end of the campaign there was some criticism of Andy Shand for frequent "butting-in" during a combined television broadcast appearance for all the candidates on Wednesday 17 February.

Results
The following table gives the election results:

The election-night margin to Labour of 1131 was so great that the final result was not expected to change when special votes, which generally tended to go to National, were counted. There were 32 informal votes.
 
George Chapman was the Wellington National Party chairman. He heard reports that all was not well in the campaign, the party was in deep trouble, and that Labour was making an all-out effort. But he found that party president Ned Holt was complacent about the by-election; saying that everything was in order, and that in any case National's majority in Marlborough was big enough to absorb any setback. But on by-election night Labour inflicted a stunning defeat on National, reducing the Government majority from six to four, and shaking party confidence. Chapman became the leader for change in the organisation, resulting in his nomination for party president in 1971, although he did not become president until 1973.

Despite winning a surprise victory in 1969, National was so embarrassed from the by-election defeat it triggered the media to seriously speculate about Prime Minister Keith Holyoake's retirement.

Notes

References

Marlborough 1970
1970 elections in New Zealand
Politics of the Marlborough Region
February 1970 events in New Zealand